Philotheca nodiflora is a species of flowering plant in the family Rutaceae and is endemic to Western Australia. It is a weak shrub with more or less cylindrical leaves and blue to pink flowers arranged in compact heads.

Description

Taxonomy and naming
This species was first formally described in 1939 by John Lindley who gave it the name Eriostemon nodiflorus and published the description in A Sketch of the Vegetation of the Swan River Colony. In 1998 Paul G. Wilson changed the name to Philotheca nodiflora in the journal Nuytsia and described four subspecies:
 Philotheca nodiflora subsp. calycina (Turcz.) Paul G.Wilson has flower heads  in diameter;
 Philotheca nodiflora subsp. lasiocalyx (Domin) Paul G.Wilson has flower heads  in diameter and glabrous sepals;
 Philotheca nodiflora subsp. lateriticola Paul G.Wilson (originally named as subsp. latericola) has flower heads  in diameter, sepals and the back of the petals covered with long, soft hairs;
 Philotheca nodiflora (Lindl.) Paul G.Wilson subsp. nodiflora has flower heads  in diameter, sepals covered with long, soft hairs, and glabrous petals.

Distribution and habitat
Philotheca nodiflora subsp. calycina grows in gravelly soil near Wooroloo and Wagin. Subspecies lasiocalyx grows in heath on sandy loam between Busselton, Collie and the western end of the Cape Arid National Park.
Subspecies lateriticola grows on laterite and ironstone on the Darling Range between York and Bannister.
Subspecies nodiflora grows along creeks and in winter-wet swamps between Chittering and Bindoon on the Darling Range.

Conservation status
This species and each of the four subspecies are classified as "not threatened" by the Government of Western Australia Department of Parks and Wildlife.

References

nodiflora
Flora of Western Australia
Sapindales of Australia
Plants described in 1839
Taxa named by John Lindley